Ohe is a river of Lower Saxony, Germany. At its confluence with the Marka west of Friesoythe, the river Sagter Ems is formed.

See also
List of rivers of Lower Saxony

Rivers of Lower Saxony
Rivers of Germany